Lingraja Law College commonly known as LLC is Government law institute situated at Bidutpuri Colony, Khodasingi in Berhampur of Ganjam district in the Indian state of Odisha. It offers 3 years LL.B. and 2 years Master of Laws (LL.M) courses approved by the Bar Council of India (BCI) and it is affiliated to Berhampur University. Lingaraj Law College was established in 1969.

References

Educational institutions established in 1969
1969 establishments in Orissa
Law schools in Odisha
Colleges affiliated to Berhampur University
Ganjam district